The 2015 Coates Hire Ipswich Super Sprint was a motor race for V8 Supercars held on the weekend of 31 July - 2 August 2015. It was the seventh round of fourteen in the 2015 International V8 Supercars Championship.

Race results

Qualifying - Race 18

Qualifying - Race 19

Race 18

Race 19

Qualifying - Race 20

Race 20

References 

Ipswich
July 2015 sports events in Australia
August 2015 sports events in Australia